Nongdao is a town in Ruili, Yunnan, China.

Etymology
The name of "Nongdao" means moss pond in Dai language.

Administrative division
As of 2016, the town is divided into four villages: 
 Nongdao
 Dengxiu
 Leiyun, also called Lowing
 Dengga

History
In 1932, the Yunnan government set up the Ruili Administrative Bureau, the government office was in the town. Two years later, Nongdao was designated as a town. At the end of 1948, the Ruili Incident broke out, the Jingpo people burned down the government office. After the establishment of the Communist State in 1949, it came under the jurisdiction of the 3rd District of Ruili County. During the Cultural Revolution, it was renamed "Weidong People's Commune" and then "Nongdao People's Commune". Nongdao became a district in 1984 and a township in 1986. In February 1993, the Nongdao Economic Development Zone was founded in the town. In May 2000, it was upgraded to a town. In 2005, the economic development zone merged into the town. In 2013, Ruili government moved the Ruili Border Economic Cooperation Zone to Nongdao.

Geography
Nongdao is located at the confluence of Namwan River and Shweli River.

Economy
The town's economy is based on nearby border trade and agricultural resources. The main crops are rice, sugarcane and tobacco.

The Ruili Border Economic Cooperation Zone is located in the town.

The Sino-Myanmar pipelines enters China from the town.

Demographics

In 2016, the local population was 14,146, including 2,167 Han (15.3%), 10,920 Dai (77.2%) and 1,018 Jingpo (7.2%).

Tourist attractions
The Site of Central Aircraft Manufacturing Company (Lowing Factory) and Mang'ai Temple are popular attractions in the town.

Transportation
The Longling–Ruili Expressway passes across the town.

References

Bibliography
 
 

Divisions of Ruili